Counties 2 Yorkshire, previously known as Yorkshire 2 is an English rugby union league at the eighth tier of the domestic competition for teams from Yorkshire. Club rugby in Yorkshire operates without promotion play-offs meaning that the top two teams are automatically promoted to Yorkshire 1 and the bottom two teams are relegated to Yorkshire 3.  Each season a team from Yorkshire 2 is picked to take part in the RFU Senior Vase - a national competition for clubs at level 8.

Participating clubs 2021–22

The teams competing in 2021-22 achieved their places in the league based on performances in 2019-20, the 'previous season' column in the table below refers to that season not 2020-21.

Season 2020–21

On 30 October 2020 the RFU announced  that due to the coronavirus pandemic a decision had been taken to cancel Adult Competitive Leagues (National League 1 and below) for the 2020/21 season meaning Yorkshire 2 was not contested.

Participating clubs 2019–20

Participating clubs 2018–19

Participating clubs 2017–18

Participating clubs 2016–17
Barnsley	
Leodiensian	
Moortown	
Old Crossleyans (relegated from Yorkshire 1)
Old Grovians 
Old Rishworthians
Pontefract 
Ripon 
Roundhegians	
Sheffield Medicals	
Thornensians (promoted from Yorkshire 3)
Wath-upon-Dearne 
West Park Leeds (relegated from Yorkshire 1)
Wetherby (promoted from Yorkshire 3)

Participating clubs 2015–16
Barnsley	
Castleford (promoted from Yorkshire 3)
Keighley 
Knottingley	
Leodiensian	
Moortown	
Old Grovians (promoted from Yorkshire 3)
Old Rishworthians
Pontefract (relegated from Yorkshire 1)
Ripon	
Roundhegians	
Sheffield Medicals	
Wath-upon-Dearne (relegated from Yorkshire 1)
West Leeds

Participating clubs 2014–15
Barnsley
Bradford Salem	
Goole (promoted from Yorkshire 3)
Keighley (relegated from Yorkshire 1)
Knottingley	
Leeds Medics and Dentists (promoted from Yorkshire 3)
Leodiensian	
Moortown	
Old Rishworthians
Ripon	
Roundhegians	
Sheffield Medicals	
West Leeds	
West Park Leeds

Participating clubs 2013–14
Baildon (promoted from Yorkshire 3)
Barnsley (relegated from Yorkshire 1)
Bradford Salem	
Hullensians	
Knottingley	
Leodiensian	
Moortown	
Old Rishworthians (promoted from Yorkshire 3)
Ripon
Roundhegians
Sheffield Medicals
West Leeds	
West Park Leeds	
Yarnbury

Participating clubs 2012–13
Bradford Salem	
Castleford
Doncaster Phoenix
Hullensians
Leodiensian
Moortown
Ripon	
Roundhegians
Selby	
Sheffield Medicals
Skipton
West Leeds
West Park Leeds
Yarnbury

Original teams
When league rugby began in 1987 this division contained the following teams:

Doncaster
Huddersfield Y.M.C.A.
Ilkley
Ionians 
Leodiensian
Malton & Norton
North Ribblesdale
Old Otliensians
Sheffield Tigers
Wath upon Dearne
Wheatley Hills

Yorkshire 2 honours

Yorkshire 2 (1987–1993)

The original Yorkshire 2 was a tier 10 league with promotion up to Yorkshire 1 and relegation down to Yorkshire 3.

Yorkshire 2 (1993–2000)

The creation of National 5 North for the 1993–94 season meant that Yorkshire 2 dropped to become a tier 11 league.  A further restructure at the end of the 1995–96 season, which included the cancellation of National 5 North and the addition of North East 3 at tier 9, saw Yorkshire 2 remain at tier 11.

Yorkshire 2 (2000–present)

Northern league restructuring by the RFU at the end of the 1999–2000 season saw the cancellation of North East 1, North East 2 and North East 3 (tiers 7–9).  This meant that Yorkshire 2 became a tier 8 league.

Number of league titles

Scarborough (3)
Barnsley (2)
Bradford Salem (2)
Huddersfield Y.M.C.A. (2)
North Ribblesdale (2)
Selby (2)
Beverley (1)
Bridlington (1)
Castleford (1)
Dinnington (1)
Goole (1)
Keighley (1)
Malton & Norton (1)
Moortown (1)
Northallerton (1)
Old Brodleians (1)
Old Otliensians (1)
Pocklington (1)
Pontefract (1)
Roundhegians (1)
Sheffield Tigers (1)
Wath upon Dearne (1)
West Leeds (1)
Wheatley Hills (1)
Wibsey (1)
Yarnbury (1)

See also
Yorkshire RFU
English rugby union system
Rugby union in England

Notes

References

8
Rugby union competitions in Yorkshire